Mortgage is a 1990 Australian drama film directed by Bill Bennett.

Plot
Dave and Tina Dodd want to buy a house. They make a contract with shifty John Napper who suggests builder George Shooks.

Production
The film was one of a series of drama documentaries produced at Film Australia for the Nine Network dealing with social issues. It was made using improvisation. Others in the series included Prejudice.

Bill Bennett described it as one of his favourite films.

References

External links

Australian drama films
Films directed by Bill Bennett
1990 films
Mortgage industry of Australia
1990 drama films
1990s English-language films
1990s Australian films